"Mongoloid" is the first single released by American new wave band Devo in 1977, on the Booji Boy Records label. It was backed with the song "Jocko Homo". "Mongoloid" also had one of the first music videos made using collage. "Mongoloid" would later be re-recorded by Devo and appeared on the album Q: Are We Not Men? A: We Are Devo! in 1978. It is also a staple of Devo's live shows.

Song description
"Mongoloid", like many of Devo's early songs, was built on a motorik beat. The song opens with a 4/4 electric bass line, which is then joined by drums, and electric guitar. Over this, a swooping overdubbed synthesizer line featuring frequent pitch bend is played on Minimoog. The synth is not used as a lead instrument during the song, and is used only in the opening and closing. The doubled vocals are sung simultaneously by both Gerald V. Casale and Robert "Bob 1" Mothersbaugh. On the original single, the vocals are deliberately sung in a nasal fashion. The lyrics describe a man who has Down syndrome yet leads a normal life in a de-evolved society, hence the lyric "He was a Mongoloid, Mongoloid / His friends were unaware / Mongoloid, he was a Mongoloid / Nobody even cared".

Music video
"Mongoloid" was Devo's second music video, after The Truth About De-Evolution. It was not actually made by the band, but by assemblage artist and experimental filmmaker Bruce Conner. Conner combined 1950s television advertisements, science fiction film clips (including a scene from It Came from Outer Space), and scientific documentaries with abstract animation and original film work. Devo marketed the film as "A documentary film exploring the manner in which a determined young man overcame a basic mental defect and became a useful member of society. Insightful editing techniques reveal the dreams, ideals and problems that face a large segment of the American male population. Very educational. Background music written and performed by the DEVO orchestra."

"Mongoloid" appears as a bonus feature on The Complete Truth About De-Evolution DVD.

Discography
"Mongoloid" was originally recorded as a single released on the Booji Boy Records label in 1977. The original single was a triple gatefold, held together with stickers. The inside of the gatefold displayed the lyrics of the two songs in either blue or black ink depending on the pressing. The back cover of the single was an image of Booji Boy with the text "We're all Devo! Booji Boy XO."

As Devo gained fame, Stiff Records in the UK agreed to release the single on their label. There were several pressings of the "Mongoloid" single with varying packages, ranging from a full triple gatefold, to a simple picture sleeve, to a generic "Stiff Records" paper sleeve. The Stiff Records releases are marked by the Stiff logo in the lower left hand corner of the front cover.

Both songs featured on the single were re-recorded for the band's debut album Are We Not Men? We Are Devo!. The original single versions can be found on the Pioneers Who Got Scalped anthology.

Tour 
In order to promote the single, Devo undertook a 'tour' using their limited budget to promote it.

Other versions
For Devo's debut album Q: Are We Not Men? A: We Are Devo!, "Mongoloid" was re-recorded. This version contains much more involved synthesizer playing throughout the song rather than during the opening and closing. An "E-Z Listening" version of "Mongoloid" was made for playing before concerts and appears on the 1987 E-Z Listening Disc. In 2002, Devo performed a techno version of "Mongoloid" at a special show for the writers and producers of the cartoon Rugrats (for which Mark Mothersbaugh composed the theme song).  In 2007, Gerald Casale played an acoustic version of "Mongoloid" accompanied on the piano by Re/Search co-founder V. Vale at a re-release party for Industrial Culture Handbook.  The video is available on the Re/Search Publications website.

Covers
"Mongoloid" has been one of the most frequently covered songs in the Devo catalog:
In 1979 a Finnish punk band, Sehr Schnell, recorded the song in a Finnish punk collection album, "Hilselp", with lyrics in Finnish, "Mongoloidi".
A 1979 Rhino Records compilation of Devo covers by various local bands, titled KROQ-FM Devotees Album, features three humorous versions of this song recorded by Jupiter, the Deadliners, and the Sordes.
Lost Kids, a Danish punk band, covered the track in the song Asocial with different lyrics, released on the 1978 EP Født Som Nul and the 1979 compilation Pære punk.
 A bluegrass version, recorded in Cleveland, Ohio, by the Hotfoot Quartet in 1980 and released as a 45 rpm single on the Black Snake label.
Siniestro Total, a punk band from Galicia (Spain), released a cover of the song (renaming it as "Mongoloide" and with lyrics in Spanish) as the B side of the single "Si yo Canto" from their 1984 album "Menos mal que nos queda Portugal". This cover also appears in their 1993 compilation album "Ojalá estuvieras aquí". 
Zvoncekova Bilježnica, a Serbian hardcore/post-punk band covered this song for their 1992 album Inžinjeri ljudskih duša in Serbian language with different lyrics.
 Demented Are Go, a Welsh psychobilly band, covered it on their 1993 album Tangenital Madness on a Pleasant Side of Hell.
 Australian ska band The Porkers covered this song for their 1994 album, Grunt!
 Thrash metal group Demolition Hammer covers the song on their 1994 album Timebomb.
 Possum Dixon performed a Spanish cover, "El Mongoloido", on We Are Not Devo, the Devo tribute album released in 1997.
 A choral version of the song, both A Capella and with instrumental accompaniment, was released by the German band Popchor Berlin in 2002 on their EP-1" album.
 Sepultura covered the song on their 2002 Revolusongs EP.
The Washington Dead Cats, a French punkabilly band, covered "Mongoloid" on their album "El Diablo is Back" in 2006.
 In 2007, Datarock performed an acoustic version of the song for Like a Version, a segment on the national Australian radio station, Triple J.
 "Loose n Boozy" Vancouver BC band The Cadaver Dogs, referred to as "the Blue Cheer of country" included a bonus hidden track cover of "Mongoloid " on their 2008 release PARIAH SOCIAL. The tune came out of a late night drunken Crazy Horse type jam...ragged, but right!
 Rummelsnuff, a German industrial/punk musician, covered "Mongoloid" on his first record Halt Durch! in 2008.
Alpha Consumer, a Minneapolis rock band covered the song on their debut album.
 The Belgian rock band The Assassinators plays a cover version of the song.
Layo & Bushwacka used samples from this song on their track "Love Story".
The Chilean band Los Mox covered this song on their album Con Cover. 
The Real Losers, a Leeds garage rock band did a cover on their last album "Music for Funsters".
The Sky Fades Away, a Russian post-punk band covered this song.
 "Mongoloid" was also covered by an early incarnation of the band October Rising, when they were known as the "Star Spangled Bastards".
 A slightly altered version of the chorus serves as the theme music of the Androsynth race in the Star Control computer games.
 In the Flemish film Ex Drummer, the main character's band The Feminists do a version of "Mongoloid" in rehearsals and in concert. This version was recorded by Belgian band Millionaire.
 German punk and synthpunk band Jennifer Rostock covered the song on the expanded version of their debut album "Ins Offene Messer - Jetzt Noch Besser!"
 The Finnish band, The Valkyrians covered the song in 2011 on the album, Punkrocksteady.
 German band Ernst recorded a cover of the song in the German language.
 Pertti Kurikan Nimipäivät covered the song with Sehr Schnell's Finnish translation in 2014.

References

1977 debut singles
Collage film
Devo songs
Song recordings produced by Brian Eno
Songs written by Gerald Casale
Works about Down syndrome
1976 songs